Big God is a 1991 studio album by Christian music vocal group The Imperials and is their second album released on the Star Song label. The personnel line-up for this album consists of Armond Morales, David Will and two new singers Jonathan Pierce (who was credited on the album by his birth name Jonathan Hildreth. Pierce is his middle name.) and, in an Imperials first, Armond's sister Pam Morales. Morales would be the first and only female member of the group. Morales and Pierce replaced Ron Hemby and David Robertson whom both previously appeared on the 1990 album Love's Still Changing Hearts. Jason Beddoe was with the group temporarily but he left the group while in the midst of recording Big God so Armond brought Pam to fill in for Beddoe. This line-up would stay on until their next album Stir It Up (1992). Big God peaked at number 22 on the Billboard Top Christian Albums chart.

Track listing

Personnel 

The Imperials
 Jonathan Pierce - tenor (lead vocals on tracks 1, 2, 5, 7, 9, 10)
 Pam Morales – alto (lead vocals on tracks 1, 4, 8, 9, 10)
 David Will – baritone (lead vocals on tracks 3 & 6)
 Armond Morales – bass (lead vocals on track 1)

Musicians
 Bob Patin – keyboards, arrangements 
 Blair Masters – special effects programming 
 Brent Rowan – guitars
 David Hungate – bass
 Mark Hammond – drums 
 Eric Darken – percussion 
 Kristin Wilkinson – string arrangements and conductor 
 John Catchings and Bob Mason – cello
 Jim Grosjean and Gary Vanosdale – viola 
 David Angell, Conni Ellisor, Carl Gorodetzky, Lee Larrison, Ted Madsen, Laura Molynlaux and Pamela Sixfin – violin 
 Leah Jane Berinati – vocal arrangements (1, 2, 4-9)
 Mark Pagen – vocal arrangements (3, 10)

Production
 Armond Morales – executive producer 
 Ken Mansfield – producer, arrangements
 Bryan Lenox – first engineer 
 John Kuniz – second engineer 
 Brent King – overdub engineer 
 Milan Bogdan – editing and sequencing at Masterfonics (Nashville, Tennessee)
 Stephen Marcussen – mastering at Precision Mastering (Hollywood, California)
 Toni Thigpen – creative direction
 Gina Binkley – design, photo illustration
 Mark Tucker – photography, photo illustration
 Michael Tyler – make-up

Critical reception
Phil Thomson of Cross Rhythms gave Big God 8 out of 10 saying "the choice of songs, the gutsy production, soaring quasi-black vocal leads against disciplined harmony, insistent percussion and a real sense of purpose - just enough drama to imbue the set with urgency, you have to rise above the penchant for oh-so-sincere build-up on one or two tracks, treatments which, in any other context might slip into parody. To their credit, they have been economical with the strings. There's significance in the label - Star Song Communications - where so many other acts dish up elevator music, this quartet really does communicate."

Charts

Radio singles

References

1991 albums
The Imperials albums